The 1926 Utah Utes football team was an American football team that represented the University of Utah as a member of the Rocky Mountain Conference (RMC) during the 1926 college football season. In their second season under head coach Ike Armstrong, the Utes compiled an overall record of 7–0 with a mark of 5–0 in conference play, won the RMC championship, and outscored opponents by a total of 164 to 23. As a reward for compiling the first perfect season in school history, Utah sailed to Hawaii to play a quasi-bowl game against . Knute Rockne served as a referee for the game, which Utah won 17–7. Thornton Morris was the team captain.

Schedule

References

Utah
Utah Utes football seasons
Rocky Mountain Athletic Conference football champion seasons
College football undefeated seasons
Utah Utes football